Hamirpur district is in the Indian state of Himachal Pradesh. The headquarters of the district are in the town of Hamirpur.

History
Carved out from Kangra District in 1972, Hamirpur District is closely associated with the Katoch dynasty. It was part of the old Jalandhar-Trigarta empire. Panin referred to the people of this kingdom as great warriors and fighters. The Katoch dynasty predominated during the period of Raja Hamir Chand, who ruled from 1700 to 1740 and built the fort at Hamirpur The present town derived its name from this ruler.

Economy

The Army is the largest employer for residents of Hamirpur, who form large bulks of the Dogra Regiment, Jammu and Kashmir Rifles regiment, the Grenadiers, the Rajput regiment, Hodson's Horse and Scinde Horse. Thousand of locals also serve in the Indian Air Force, Indian Navy, and paramilitary forces. The Indian Army conducts an open army rally under the Hamirpur Army recruitment office every year, where thousands of youngsters try to join the Indian Army.

Geography

Hamirpur district is situated between 31°25′N and 31°52′N and between 76°18′E and 76°44′E. Hamirpur (town), the district headquarters, is situated at an altitude of 780 m with the highest point being the Awah Devi peak at an altitude of 1250 m. 

The district shares borders with the neighbouring districts of Mandi to the east, Bilaspur to the south, Una to the west, and Kangra to the north. The River Beas separates Hamirpur from Kangra and is a parent river to two tributaries, namely Maan Khad and Kunah Khad ('Khad' is a word used to describe a rivulet) flowing across either side of Hamirpur district, to the adjacent Sutlej. Hamirpur district has a considerable amount of pine forests and it is also surrounded by Shivalik Ranges. Hamirpur is also home to mango trees.

It has highest Road density amongst all the districts in India.

Climate

Hamirpur has the quintessential 'hill-station' weather found in most of Himachal Pradesh. During winter, the climate is very cold. Woollen clothing is required from August up to the end of March. During summers, the temperature often crosses 40 °C and cotton is recommended. It does not normally snow in the district but in January 2012 (after 44 years) and February 2019 some parts of Hamirpur district were reported to receive moderate snowfall.

Divisions
The divisions  Hamirpur, Barsar, Nadaun, Sujanpur and Bhoranj comprise the district. 

Hamirpur district divided into 8 tehsils:

Hamirpur Sadar
Nadaun 
Sujanpur
Barsar
Bhoranj 
Tauni devi
Dhatwal (Bijhari)
Galore
Lamblu(sub tehsil)
There are five Vidhan Sabha constituencies in this district: Barsar, Hamirpur, Sujanpur, Nadaun and Bhoranj. All of these are part of the Hamirpur, Himachal Pradesh Lok Sabha constituency.

Demographics

According to the 2011 census, Hamirpur district has a population of 454,768, giving it a rank of 550th-largest in India (out of a total of 640). Its population growth rate over the decade 2001–2011 was 10.19%. Hamirpur has a sex ratio of 1095 (i.e.- females for every 1000 males) again highest in the state, and a literacy rate of 88.15%, the highest in the state. 6.91% of the population lives in urban areas. Scheduled Castes and Scheduled Tribes make up 24.02% and 0.67% of the population respectively.

A large proportion of the people in this district serve in the defense services, thus also known as “Veer Bhoomi” (English: Land of the heroes).

At the 2011 Census of India, 76% of the population declared their first language to be Pahari, 14.1% chose Hindi, 3.55% – Kangri, and 0.75% – Dogri.

Politics 

 

|}

References

External links
 Hamirpur district website
 District Profile
 Cultural & Tourism Heritage of the District
 Developmental Data of the District
 Himachal tourism
 
 Army Rally Bharti 2021 Himachal Pradesh
https://drdahamirpurhp.nic.in/abdistrict.html
https://himachaltourism.gov.in/destination/hamirpur/

 
Districts of Himachal Pradesh
1972 establishments in Himachal Pradesh